The Kelly Keen coyote fatal attack is the only known fatal coyote attack on a child, as well as the only known fatal coyote attack on a human ever confirmed in the United States. On August 26, 1981, three-year-old Los Angeles resident Kelly Lynn Keen was dragged off her property and fatally wounded by an urban coyote before being rescued by her father. The event is also notable for its aftermath, in which large numbers of coyotes were killed and two animal rights activists provoked an uproar by claiming that her parents, not the coyote, had killed her.

Attack
On August 26, 1981, a three-year-old girl named Kelly Keen was left alone while her mother Cathy did some daily chores. Kelly was watching educational television programs in the living room of the family's home in the Chevy Chase Canyon Neighborhood of Glendale, California, but she let herself out the front door and stepped into the driveway, where she encountered an urban coyote. The coyote took Kelly in its mouth and ran off, dragging her through the street. Her father, Robert, quickly came running, chased the coyote off, and rushed Kelly to the Glendale Adventist Medical Center, where she was in surgery for four hours before she died. The cause of death was determined to be a broken neck and blood loss as a direct result of the coyote attack. She is buried at Forest Lawn Memorial Park in Glendale.

Aftermath

Government reaction
Following Keen's death, the Los Angeles Animal Regulation Commission developed the first serious urban coyote management program, including 80 days of leghold trapping and shooting within a 0.5-mile (0.8-km) radius of the attack site, during which county personnel trapped and shot 55 coyotes.

Accusations by animal rights activists
In 2004, former child actress and animal rights activist Pamelyn Ferdin attended a Glendale City Council meeting to oppose a proposal to cull urban coyotes. Ferdin addressed the Council wearing a shirt covered in fake blood, urging the city not to kill coyotes. She mentioned the Kelly Keen attack, and argued that rather than having been killed by a coyote, Keen had been the victim of child abuse. She claimed that medical records indicated that the child died of a ruptured spleen, which could only have come from blunt trauma, not an animal bite. Fellow animal rights activist Michael Bell went further, claiming that, after digging around in hospital records, he discovered discrepancies and missing documents. He stated that the coyote story was a cover-up for how the child really died. Kelly's parents, Robert and Cathy Keen, watched the meeting live on cable and, upon hearing Bell's statement, raced to the Glendale City hall to respond to the allegations. They recounted the event to the council, and showed the death certificate, which listed the cause of the child's injuries as "mauled by a coyote".

Ferdin's stance remained unchanged; "I stand by my beliefs that a coyote did not kill [Kelly Keen]." Councilman Frank Quintero stated: "What the activists said at the dais was cruel and absolutely uninformed ... Knowing the mother, it broke my heart that they would do that to her. When they were making the accusations, I was considering stopping them."

Similar attacks

USDA and California State University researchers have confirmed at least thirty-five incidents in the state in which "the possibility of serious or fatal injury seems likely if the child had not been rescued" from coyotes, including the following sample of confirmed coyote attacks on children in California that were likely to have ended similarly if the child had not been saved in time:

 In August 1979, in La Verne, a coyote attacked a 5-year-old girl. Her father and a neighbor saved the child from being dragged off, but not before she had suffered deep bites on neck, head, and legs.
 In July 1980, in Agoura Hills, a coyote grabbed a 13-month-old girl by the midsection and started dragging her off. She suffered puncture wounds but was saved by her mother.
 In August 1988, in Oceanside, a coyote bit the rollerskate of an 8-year-old girl who had just fallen but was chased away by two women throwing rocks. Another coyote grabbed a 3-year-old girl by the leg, pulled her down, and bit her on her head and neck before her mother and neighbors chased it off. 
 In May 1992, in San Clemente, a coyote attacked a 5-year-old girl, biting her several times on her back and legs. She climbed her swing set to escape, and her mother chased the coyote off. 
 In March 1995, in Griffith Park, a 5-year-old girl was knocked down twice by a coyote and bitten, before being saved by her mother.
 In June 1996, in Los Altos, a coyote grabbed a 3-year-old boy's head and hand and began dragging him toward some bushes before he was saved by his 15-year-old brother.
In June 2001, in Northridge, a coyote attacked and seriously injured a 7-year-old girl, but was finally fought off by her mother.
In July 2001, in Irvine, a coyote bit a 3-year-old boy in the leg while he was playing in his yard. He was saved by his father.
In December 2001, in San Gabriel, a coyote bit a 3-year-old girl in the head, grabbed her shoulder and started to drag her away, but was chased off by her father.
In August 2003, in Apple Valley, a coyote attacked a 4-year-old boy on a golf course, biting him on the face and neck before he was saved by his father.

Other reports of non-fatal coyote attacks on children in California: 
 On June 28, 2010, a coyote jumped on a twelve-year-old girl in Spring Valley. The girl fell backwards and injured her elbow, but she was not bitten. 
 On July 18, 2013, at about 3:15p.m., at Forest Lawn Cemetery in Cypress, a two-year-old girl was attacked by a coyote while playing about ten feet away from her mother, who was visiting her grandmother's grave.  The coyote grabbed the playing child and started to drag her off into the bushes, but dropped the child and ran away when "lunged at" by the mother.  The child was hospitalized for a 2.5 inch gash to the leg and began precautionary treatment for rabies.  Authorities killed three coyotes at the cemetery later that day, and cemetery officials ordered warning signs be posted and traps be set around the cemetery but away from public areas.  On October 9, the mother filed suit alleging that the cemetery, by not warning her of the risk, had liability.
 On November 16, 2014, a woman claimed that her four-year-old daughter was knocked down by a coyote outside her Hollywood, home. After the attack, the Department of Fish and Wildlife investigated but couldn't find any coyote, and a local television news program described the attack as "alleged".
 On December 25, 2014, in Fremont, California, just after 6:00p.m., a boy was bitten in an attack by an apparently sick coyote. He was saved by his father.  Before the attack, about a block away, the coyote had attacked and bitten the leg of a man walking his children to his car outside a home.  After the attack, the coyote chased and bit a jogger on a nearby street but ran away when kicked; the police shot and killed the coyote, which tested negative for rabies.
 On May 22, 2015, in Irvine, a three-year-old girl was picking up after their dog that she, her twin sister, and her mother had been walking, when a coyote ran out of a hedge and attempted to bite the back of her neck, but was saved by her mother and other nearby adults. After the attack, the Department of Fish and Wildlife attempted to track and trap the coyote. Before the attack, a coyote had reportedly chased another girl in the same area.
 On May 22, 2015, in Irvine at Silverado Park, a two-year-old girl was in her garage when the door was opened and a coyote in the driveway came in and bit her on the neck and cheek.   
 On October 14, 2015, in Irvine, a thirty-one-year-old man and his three-year-old son were attacked by a coyote while they were in a garden.
 On October 9, 2016, in Irvine at Springbrook Park, a coyote bit a six-year-old boy. The boy's father along with bystanders shouted at it and one woman threw sand, and the coyote ran away.
 On December 2, 2022, in Woodland Hills, a toddler was dragged away by a coyote from her front lawn, but was rescued by her father. The incident was caught on security camera footage. 

Coyote attack on teenagers in California: 
 On July 22, 2016, a coyote bit a seventeen-year-old girl on her leg at Grant Rea Park in Montebello.

See also

 Death of Azaria Chamberlain
 Death of Kenton Joel Carnegie
 Death of Diane Whipple
 Death of Taylor Mitchell
 Animal attacks

References

Accidental deaths in California
Canid attacks
Deaths by person in California
Deaths due to animal attacks in the United States
Deaths due to coyote attacks
Glendale, California
History of Los Angeles County, California
1981 in California